"Your Loving Flame" is a love song by Paul McCartney, written for his second wife Heather Mills. It appeared on his 2001 album Driving Rain. It was released as a jukebox single in 2002, backed with "Lonely Road".

The song was first performed live on December 3rd, 1999 during McCartney's interview on Parkinson with David Gilmour playing the guitar solo. A live version appeared on the albums Back in the U.S. (2002) and Back in the World (2003), as well as the accompanying DVD. The song was also performed live at the Nobel Peace Prize awards in 2001.

The music video for "Your Loving Flame" did not appear on McCartney's 2007 DVD The McCartney Years.

References

Paul McCartney songs
2001 singles
Songs written by Paul McCartney
2001 songs
Parlophone singles
Song recordings produced by David Kahne